Dallas Americans was an American soccer club based in Dallas, Texas that was a member of the American Soccer League. After the ASL folded, the club joined the newly formed United Soccer League, which itself lasted two seasons. It is also the name of an Indoor American Football team.

Year-by-year

1985 USL League Cup standings

1985 team scoring leaders (USL Cup only)

Yearly Awards
ASL Top Goal Scorer 
 Jeff Bourne- 1983 (17 Goals)

ASL Top Points Scorer 
 Jeff Bourne - 1983 (38 Points)

References

 
 

 
United Soccer League (1984–85) teams
Soccer clubs in Texas
Defunct soccer clubs in Texas
Americans
American Soccer League (1933–1983) teams
1983 establishments in Texas
1985 disestablishments in Texas
Association football clubs established in 1983
Association football clubs disestablished in 1985